Thomas Burnett  (1852 in England – ?) was a Welsh international footballer. He was part of the Wales national football team, playing 1 match on 5 March 1877 against Scotland.

See also
 List of Wales international footballers (alphabetical)

References

1852 births
Welsh footballers
Wales international footballers
Place of birth missing
Date of death missing
Year of death missing
Association football goalkeepers